Karel Brančik (13 March 184218 November 1915) was a Hungarian doctor and naturalist.
He practised medicine at Trenčín and was interested in entomology, malacology and botany. In 1913 he founded the museum at Trenčín. He made a large collection of Coleoptera which was acquired by the Vienna entomologist Eduard Knirsch (1869–1955) before his collection was acquired by the Field Museum of Natural History, Chicago.

Notes

Sources
Anthony Musgrave (1932). Bibliography of Australian Entomology, 1775–1930, with biographical notes on authors and collectors, Royal Zoological Society of News South Wales (Sydney) : viii + 380.
Guido Nonveiller (2001). Pioneers of the Research on the Insects of Dalmatia. Croatian Natural History Museum (Zagreb) : 390 p.

Slovak entomologists
1842 births
1915 deaths